The Ibrahim Index of African Governance (IIAG), established in 2007, provides an annual assessment of the quality of governance in African countries.  Compiled by combining over 100 variables from more than 30 independent African and global institutions, the IIAG is the most comprehensive collection of data on African governance.

The IIAG provides a framework for citizens, governments, institutions and the private sector to accurately assess the delivery of public goods and services, and policy outcomes, across the continent.  As well as being a tool to help determine and debate government performance, the IIAG is a decision-making instrument with which to govern.

The Foundation defines governance as the provision of the political, social and economic goods that a citizen has the right to expect from his or her state, and that a state has the responsibility to deliver to its citizens.  The IIAG assesses progress under four main conceptual categories: Safety & Rule of Law, Participation & Human Rights, Sustainable Economic Opportunity, and Human Development. These four pillars are populated with data that cover governance elements ranging from infrastructure to freedom of expression and sanitation to property rights.

The IIAG allows users to benchmark governance performance across a number of dimensions at the national, regional and continental levels.  Scores and ranks are available for all years from 2000, enabling the analysis of trends over time.  All of the underlying data used in the construction of the IIAG are freely available and transparently published alongside a comprehensive methodology.

History 

The Ibrahim Index of African Governance is a key initiative of the Mo Ibrahim Foundation. It has been published annually since 2007, with launch events in various African cities, including Accra, Cairo, Dakar, Johannesburg and Nairobi. The most recent iteration of the Index, the 2015 IIAG was published in October 2015.

The index was initially produced in association with Harvard University; academic and technical assistance has subsequently been provided by a range of African academics and research bodies.

The IIAG is designed as a tool for citizens, governments, institutions and business to assess the delivery of public goods and services, and policy outcomes, across Africa. It is an annual publication which receives extensive media attention from across the African continent and in the international media. The Ibrahim Index has been used by civil society and government bodies across the continent to monitor governance. One example is in South Africa, where the party in opposition, the Democratic Alliance, used the Ibrahim Index to challenge the government's record on safety and security.

In 2007, critique suggested that the Index was limited by its focus on the 48 Sub-Saharan African countries, ignoring Morocco, Algeria, Tunisia, Libya and Egypt. To be a fully representative Index of African Governance, as it claimed, it needed to expand its coverage to include North Africa. The 2009 index first included these countries. Aside from these five additions, the index first included South Sudan, which became a separate country in 2011, during its 2019 report.

Methodology 

The Ibrahim Index of African Governance (IIAG) is an annually published composite index that provides a statistical measure of governance performance in African countries.

Governance is defined by the Mo Ibrahim Foundation as the provision of the political, social and economic public goods and services that a citizen has the right to expect from his or her state, and that a state has the responsibility to deliver to its citizens. This definition is focused on outputs and outcomes of policy. The IIAG governance framework comprises four dimensions (categories):

Safety & Rule of Law
Participation & Human Rights
Sustainable Economic Opportunity
Human Development

These categories are made up of 14 sub-categories, consisting of over 100 indicators. The latest IIAG is calculated using data from more than 30 independent sources.

Annual refinements are made to the IIAG, which may be methodological, or based on the inclusion or exclusion of indicators. The entire IIAG data set is therefore retrospectively revised, in accordance with best practices. Comparisons between years should therefore be performed entirely on the 2013 IIAG data set.

Indicators 

The latest IIAG comprises over 100 indicators, grouped into four broad categories: Safety & Rule of Law, Participation and Human Rights, Sustainable Economic Opportunity and Human Development.

Safety and Rule of Law 

The 23 indicators in the Safety & Rule of Law category are divided into four sub-categories: Rule of Law, Accountability, Personal Safety and National Security. Scores in this category range from 4.9 for Somalia to 88.9 for Botswana in 2013.

The Rule of Law sub-category includes five indicators: Judicial Process, Judicial Independence, Sanctions, Transfers of Power and Property Rights.

The Accountability sub-category includes seven indicators measuring Accountability, Transparency & Corruption in the Public Sector, Accountability, Transparency & Corruption in the Rural Sector, Corruption and Bureaucracy, Accountability of Public Officials, Corruption in Government & Public Officials, Prosecution of Abuse of Office and Diversion of Public Funds.

The Personal Safety sub-category includes six indicators measuring Domestic Political Persecution,  Social Unrest, Safety of the Person, Reliability of Police Services, Violent Crime and Human Trafficking.

The National Security sub-category includes five indicators measuring Cross Border Tensions, Government Involvement in Armed Conflict, Domestic Armed Conflict, Political Refugees and Internally Displaced People.

Participation and Human Rights 

The 19 indicators in the Participation and Human Rights category are divided into three sub-categories: Participation, Rights, and Gender. Scores in this category range from 11.5 for Somalia to 81.7 for Cape Verde in 2013.

The Participation sub-category includes five indicators measuring Free and Fair Executive Elections, Free and Fair Elections, Political Participation, Electoral Self Determination and Effective Power to Govern.

The Rights sub-category includes seven indicators measuring Core International Human Rights Conventions, Human Rights, Political Rights, Workers' Rights, Freedom of Expression, Freedom of Association and Assembly and Civil Liberties.

The Gender sub-category includes seven indicators measuring Gender Equality, Gender Balance in Primary and Secondary Education, Women's Participation in the Labour Force, Equal Representation in Rural Areas, Women in Parliament, Women's Rights and Legislation on Violence against Women.

Sustainable Economic Opportunity 

The 30 indicators in the Sustainable Economic Opportunity category are divided into four sub-categories: Public Management, Business Environment, Infrastructure and Rural Sector. Scores in this category range from 2.3 for Somalia to 79.7 for Mauritius.

The Public Management sub-category includes 11 indicators measuring Statistical Capacity, Public Administration, Inflation, Diversification, Reserves, Budget Management, Ratio of Total Revenue to Total Expenditure, Fiscal Policy, Ratio of External Debt Services to Exports, Revenue Collection, and Soundness of Banks.

The Business Environment sub-category includes six indicators measuring Competition Environment, Investment Climate, Investment Climate for Rural Businesses, Bureaucracy and Red Tape, and  Customs Procedures.

The Infrastructure sub-category includes six indicators measuring Electricity, Roads, Rail Network, Air Transport, Telephone and IT Infrastructure, and Digital Connectivity.

The Rural Sector subcategory includes seven indicators measuring Public Resources for Rural Development and Land and Water for Low-Income Rural Populations, Agricultural Research and Extension Services, Agricultural Input and Produce Markets, Policy and Legal Framework for Rural Organizations, Dialogue between Government and Rural Organizations and Agricultural Policy Costs.

Human Development 

The 22 indicators in the Human Development category are divided into three sub-categories: Welfare, Health, and Education. Scores in this category range from 13.1 for Somalia to 92.2 for Seychelles in 2013.

The Welfare sub-category includes nine indicators measuring the Welfare Regime, Social Protection & Labour, Social Exclusion, Welfare Services (Health and Education), Equity of public Resource Use, Access to Water, Access to Sanitation, Environmental Policy, and Environmental Sustainability.

The Education sub-category includes seven indicators measuring the Educational Provision and Quality, Education System Quality, the Ratio of Pupils to Teachers in Primary School, Primary School Completion, Progression to Secondary School, Tertiary Enrollment, and Literacy.

The Health sub-category includes six indicators measuring Maternal Mortality, Child Mortality, Immunization (Measles & DPT), Antiretroviral Treatment Provision, Disease (Malaria & TB), and Undernourishment.

Criticism 

Some scholars have questioned the effectiveness of the Index and particularly the need for civil society to engage with its results, pointing out that there does not often exist in Africa a strong and effective civil society. Others maintain that such perspective ignores the important role that civil society is now beginning to play in African politics.

2019 IIAG Index

Previous IIAG Indexes

2013 IIAG Index

*Sudan and South Sudan are not included in the IIAG.

2014 IIAG Index

2015 IIAG Index

References

External links 
Current Ibrahim Index of African Governance Data

Political corruption
Politics of Africa
Index numbers